The Go package (or Go Pack) was a factory option that included various performance equipment that was available on several muscle cars manufactured by American Motors Corporation (AMC).

Background
During the late-1960s and early-1970s, domestic automakers lines used "catchy marketing campaigns, such as Dodge's Scat Pack, AMC's Go Package, and Ford's Total Performance."

American Motors Corporation planned a program to create a performance image that included a pulling-out from the antiquated Automobile Manufacturers Association (AMA) edict against supporting automobile racing that was no longer followed by General Motors. Ford, or Chrysler. Managers at the automaker made a decision "to go after the youth market ... AMC muscle soon flourished, including not just AMX and Javelin pony cars, but other potent packages like the Hurst SC/Rambler of 1969, Rebel Machine in 1970..."

The 1968 model year Javelin was the first model to offer AMC's optional "Go" package. The official name on the dealer vehicle order forms from AMC was "Performance Package" and called Go Package in the automaker's sales brochures.

In contrast with high-performance versions – such as the 1969 Hurst SC/Rambler, 1970 Rebel Machine, and 1971 Hornet SC/360 – that had their own model number, only an original window sticker (Monroney sticker, factory order form, or a build sheet can authenticate whether a particular vehicle was originally factory equipped with a Go Pack because there is no identification code within the vehicle identification number (VIN) or on AMC's metal door tags to identify this option.

Available models
 1968–1970 AMC AMX
 1968–1974 AMC Javelin
 1971 Hornet SC/360
 1971 Matador Machine

Equipment
The actual contents of the Go Packs varied from year to year and according to specific models.

Except for the racing stripes, the performance options could also be ordered individually on the 1968 and 1969 AMXs.

For the 1970 model year AMXs and Javelins, the ram-air intake hood was only available as part of the Go Package.

The 1974 Javelin required ordering the Go Package together with the  V8 engine.

A form of continuing the 1970 Rebel Machine, which was a separate model, the 1971 Matador two-door hardtop had a Go Package option. It was offered only at the start of the model year and not even mentioned in AMC's full-line brochures. It included 15x7-inch slot-styled steel wheels with white-lettered Goodyear Polyglas tires, dual exhaust system, a heavy-duty handling package, and power disk brakes. The "Twin-Grip" rear differential was a recommended option and the limited-slip system and required in when in combination with a four-speed manual transmission and the optional 3.91 rear axle ratio.

Notes

American Motors
Automotive technology tradenames